The Pennsylvania Council on the Arts (PCA) is an agency serving the U.S. state of Pennsylvania. Its mission is to strengthen the cultural, educational, and economic vitality of Pennsylvania's communities through the arts. This mission is paired with a cross-cutting strategy of diversity, equity, and inclusion, promoting equitable access for all Pennsylvanians to participate fully in a creative life and in the diverse forms of arts and culture in the commonwealth.

Established by the General Assembly in 1966, the PCA was charged with ascertaining how Pennsylvania's artistic and cultural resources, "including those already in existence and those which should be brought into existence," are to serve the cultural needs and aspirations of the citizens of the state. Directly and through regional partnerships, the PCA addresses its mission through a combination of awarding state grant funds, supporting teaching artist residencies in schools and community settings, and offering valuable information services on a range of topics including marketing, capacity building, and community development through arts strategies. 

As a state agency it is located in the Office of the Governor. Its headquarters are in Harrisburg, Pennsylvania.

Council members
Citizen members:
Jeffrey A. Parks, Chair, Bethlehem
Jeffrey W. Gabel, Vice-Chair, Gettysburg

Emmai Alaquiva, Pittsburgh 	
Dennis L. Astorino, AIA, Pittsburgh
Natalee Colón, York 	
Susan H. Goldberg, Philadelphia
William Lehr, Jr., Palmyra
Hon. William F. Morgan, Warren
Norman E. Stull, Spinnerstown
Catzie Vilayphonh, Philadelphia
Tim Warfield, Jr., York
James A. West, Jr., Pittsburgh
Jen H. Zaborney, Harrisburg

Legislative Members:
Senator
Senator
Representative Shelby Labs, Plumsteadville
Representative Joe Ciresi, Limerick Township

See also
 List of Pennsylvania state agencies

External links
Pennsylvania Council on the Arts Home Page

Arts councils of the United States
1966 establishments in Pennsylvania
Art in Pennsylvania